Ugrin or Uhrin may refer to:

Given name
Ugrin Csák (disambiguation), multiple people

Surname
Dušan Uhrin (born 1943), Czech and Slovak football coach and former player
Dušan Uhrin, Jr. (born 1967), Czech football manager
Tea Ugrin (born 1998), Italian artistic gymnast